Lage may refer to:

Places
 Lage, Lower Saxony
 Lage, North Rhine-Westphalia
 Lage, Sulawesi

People
 Julian Lage (born 1987), American jazz guitarist and composer
 Klaus Lage (born 1950), German musician
 Natália Lage (born 1978), Brazilian actress.
 José María Sánchez Lage, Argentine footballer
 Aluizio Lage (1919–1974), Brazilian swimmer
 Jorge Enrique Lage (born 1979), Cuban novelist and short story writer
 Olivier Da Lage (born 1957), French journalist